The 1930 Western State Mountaineers football team was an American football team that represented Western State College of Colorado (now known as Western Colorado University) during the 1930 college football season as a member of the Rocky Mountain Conference (RMC). In its first year under head coach Telfer L. Mead, the team compiled a 0–6 record.

Schedule

References

Western State
Western Colorado Mountaineers football seasons
College football winless seasons
Western State Mountaineers football